Ahmed ibn Qassim ar-Rifa'i ar-Ribati was a Moroccan calligrapher interested in the reformation and standardization of Maghrebi script. 

While Arabic calligraphy had undergone standardization and reform in the Mashriq under Ibn Muqla and Ibn al-Bawwab, it hadn't done so in the Maghreb. ar-Ribati wrote Stringing the Pearls of the Thread in 1840, which was edited and republished by Muhammad Sabri. The book is in the form of an urjuza of 143 couplets.

References 

Moroccan Calligraphers
19th-century calligraphers
Year of birth missing
Year of death missing